is a railway station in Midori-ku, Nagoya, Japan, operated by Central Japan Railway Company (JR Tōkai).

Lines
Minami-Ōdaka Station is served by the Tōkaidō Main Line, and is located 351.8 kilometers from the starting point of the line at Tokyo Station.

Station layout
The station has one elevated side platform and one elevated island platform. The station building is built above the platforms. The station building has automated ticket machines, TOICA automated turnstiles and a staffed ticket office.

Platforms

Adjacent stations

|-
!colspan=5|Central Japan Railway Company

Station history
Minami-Ōdaka opened on 14 March 2009.

Station numbering was introduced to the section of the Tōkaidō Line operated JR Central in March 2018; Minami-Ōdaka Station was assigned station number CA62.

Passenger statistics
In fiscal 2017, the station was used by an average of 6,719 passengers daily

Surrounding area
This station provides access to Ōdaka Æon, a large shopping center, via a pedestrian walkway which connects the station and the shopping center directly.  Nearby is also Ōdaka Green, a park.

See also
 List of Railway Stations in Japan

References

Yoshikawa, Fumio. Tokaido-sen 130-nen no ayumi. Grand-Prix Publishing (2002) .

External links
 
Official home page

Railway stations in Japan opened in 2009
Tōkaidō Main Line
Stations of Central Japan Railway Company
Railway stations in Nagoya
Railway stations in Aichi Prefecture